Cosmos is the debut album by The Send which was released on July 31, 2007 by Tooth & Nail Records. Joseph Kisselburgh teamed up with 'Aaron Sprinkle to "bring spiritual songs into existence from beyond," rather than force a pop record.' The first single is "An Epiphany". A video was released for this song on July 12, 2007. An e-card was released for the album by Tooth & Nail on July 24, 2007 and can be watched here.

Cosmos was available for pre-order, and came autographed with a free limited edition five-song vinyl LP.

Track listing
"Need"
"Fairweather"
"An Epiphany"
"Blocking the Sun"
"Begin"
"The Fall"
"Drown"
"Santiam"
"The Science of the Sky"
"Dawn and Dusk"
"Say"
"Fire Colors"
"In Repose"

Anticipation
Cosmos was placed #16 out of #25 on Jesus Freak Hideout's
2007 highlights. They also gave it a 'Pre-Order Worthy' certification and described it as having 'a lasting impression on the listener.'.

Charts

References

External links
Cosmos E-Card

2007 debut albums
Tooth & Nail Records albums
Albums produced by Aaron Sprinkle